Aubrey Perry (born January 20, 1991) is an American soccer player who currently plays for Gräsö Norrskedika IF.

Career

Youth and college
Perry played on the collegiate level at the University of South Florida. Perry is a 2011 All-Big East Conference Third Team and is the USF’s all-time leader in games played and games started.

Professional
Perry was drafted by the Columbus Crew in the second round (26th pick overall) of the 2012 MLS SuperDraft.

Perry made his first professional appearance in a US Open Cup game against Dayton Dutch Lions on May 29, 2012.

Perry was waived by Columbus on June 27, 2012.

He played for BKV Norrtälje in Sweden, and went on to play for MD FF Köping.

In addition to playing professionally, Perry coaches soccer privately through one-on-one training session for players in Ocoee, FL area.

References

External links
 

1991 births
Living people
Sportspeople from Orange County, Florida
Soccer players from Florida
American soccer players
United States men's youth international soccer players
United States men's under-20 international soccer players
Association football defenders
Columbus Crew draft picks
Columbus Crew players
South Florida Bulls men's soccer players
MD FF Köping players
American expatriate soccer players
American expatriate sportspeople in Sweden
Expatriate footballers in Sweden